The 2022 Fanatec GT World Challenge Europe Powered by AWS is the ninth season of GT World Challenge Europe. The season began at Imola on 3 April and will end at Catalunya on 2 October. The season consists of 10 events: 5 Sprint Cup events, and 5 Endurance Cup events.

Calendar
The provisional calendar was released on 4 September 2021, in which Hockenheimring replaced Nürburgring.
The calendar was updated on 29 October 2021, as Imola replaced Monza and the season opener was rescheduled to one week earlier.

Entries
{| class="wikitable" style="font-size: 85%"
! Team
! Car
! 
! Drivers
! Class
! Rounds
|-
|rowspan=4|

| rowspan="11" | Mercedes-AMG GT3 Evo
| rowspan="4" align="center"| 2
|  Steijn Schothorst
| rowspan="4" align="center"| P
|rowspan=2| 1, 4, 7-8, 10
|-
|  Luca Stolz
|-
|  Maro Engel
| 1, 4, 8, 10
|-
|  Maximilian Götz
| 7
|-
| rowspan="7" |  GetSpeed Performance
| rowspan="3" align="center" | 3
|  Sébastien Baud
| rowspan="3" align="center" | S
| rowspan="3"| 1, 4, 7-8, 10
|-
|  Valdemar Eriksen
|-
|  Jeff Kingsley
|-
| rowspan="4" align="center"| 44
|  Patrick Assenheimer
| rowspan="4" align="center"|G
| rowspan="4" | 7
|-
|  Michael Blanchemain
|-
|  Axel Blom
|-
|  Jim Pla
|-
|rowspan="8"|  Haupt Racing Team
| rowspan="17" | Mercedes-AMG GT3 Evo
|rowspan="4" align="center"| 4
|  Jannes Fittje
|rowspan="4" align="center"| S
| rowspan="3"| 1, 4, 7-8, 10
|-
|  Jordan Love
|-
|  Alain Valente
|-
|  Frank Bird
| 7
|-
|rowspan="4" align="center"| 5
|  Hubert Haupt
|rowspan="4" align="center"| G
| rowspan="3"| 1, 4, 7-8, 10
|-
|  Arjun Maini
|-
|  Florian Scholze
|-
|  Gabriele Piana
| 7
|-
| rowspan="5" |  Sky - Tempesta Racing by HRT
| rowspan="5" align="center" | 93
|  Eddie Cheever III
| rowspan="5" align="center" | G
| rowspan="2" | 7-10
|-
|  Chris Froggatt
|-
|  Jonathan Hui
| 7, 10
|-
|  Loris Spinelli
| 7
|-
| Martin Konrad
| 8
|-
| rowspan="4" |  Al Manar Racing by HRT
| rowspan="4" align="center" | 777
|  Al Faisal Al Zubair
| rowspan="4" align="center" | S
| rowspan="3" | 1, 4, 7-8, 10
|-
|  Axcil Jefferies
|-
|  Fabian Schiller
|-
|  Daniel Morad
| 7
|-
| rowspan="3" |  Orange 1 K-PAX Racing
| rowspan="3" | Lamborghini Huracán GT3 Evo
| rowspan="3" align="center"| 6
|  Andrea Caldarelli
| rowspan="3" align="center"| P
| rowspan="3"| 7
|-
|  Marco Mapelli
|-
|  Jordan Pepper
|-
| rowspan="4" |  Inception Racing with Optimum Motorsport
| rowspan="4" | McLaren 720S GT3
| rowspan="4" align="center"| 7
|  Brendan Iribe
| rowspan="4" align="center"| G
| rowspan="3"| 1, 4, 7-8, 10
|-
|  Ollie Millroy
|-
|  Frederik Schandorff
|-
|  Sebastian Priaulx
| 7
|-
| rowspan="4" |  AGS Events
| rowspan="4" | Lamborghini Huracán GT3 Evo
| rowspan="4" align="center"| 8
|  Loris Cabirou
| rowspan="4" align="center"| G
|rowspan=3| 1, 4, 7-8, 10
|-
|  Nicolas Gomar
|-
|  Mike Parisy
|-
|  Ruben del Sarte
| 7
|-
| rowspan="7"|  Herberth Motorsport
| rowspan="12" | Porsche 911 GT3 R
| rowspan="4" align="center"| 9
|  Antares Au
| rowspan="4" align="center"| PA
| rowspan="4"| 7
|-
|  Jaxon Evans
|-
|  Dylan Pereira
|-
|  Kevin Tse
|-
| rowspan="3" align="center"| 911
|  Ralf Bohn
| rowspan="3" align="center"| G
| rowspan="3"| 1, 4, 7-8, 10
|-
|  Alfred Renauer
|-
|  Robert Renauer
|-
| rowspan="5" | Porsche Zentrum Oberer Zürichsee by Herberth
| rowspan="5" align="center"| 24
|  Nicolas Leutwiler
| rowspan="5" align="center"|PA
| rowspan="2" | 4, 7
|-
|  Alessio Picariello
|-
|  Ivan Jacoma
| 4
|-
|  Stefan Aust
| rowspan="2" | 7
|-
|  Nico Menzel
|-
| rowspan="4" |  Boutsen Ginion Racing
| rowspan="4" | Audi R8 LMS Evo II
| rowspan="4" align="center"| 10
|  Adam Eteki
| rowspan="4" align="center"| G
| rowspan="3"| 1, 4, 7-8, 10
|-
|  Benjamin Lessennes
|-
|  Karim Ojjeh
|-
|  Antoine Leclerc
| 7
|-
| rowspan="13" |

| rowspan="13" | Audi R8 LMS Evo II
| rowspan="9" align="center" | 11
|  Lorenzo Patrese
| rowspan="7" align="center" | S
| 1, 4, 7-8, 10
|-
|  Hugo Valente
| 1, 4, 8, 10
|-
|  Axel Blom
| 1, 4
|-
|  Daniele di Amato
|rowspan=3| 7
|-
|  Alberto di Folco
|-
|  Pierre-Alexandre Jean
|-
|  Thierry Vermeulen
| 8, 10
|-
|  Simon Gachet
| rowspan="2" align="center"| P
|rowspan=2| 2-3, 5-6, 9
|-
|  Christopher Haase
|-
| rowspan="4" align="center" | 12
|  Mattia Drudi
| rowspan="4" align="center" | P
| All
|-
|  Luca Ghiotto
| 1-8, 10
|-
|  Christopher Haase
| 1, 4, 7-8, 10
|-
|  Lorenzo Patrese
| 9
|-
| rowspan="10" |  Emil Frey Racing
| rowspan="10" | Lamborghini Huracán GT3 Evo
| rowspan="4" align="center" | 14
|  Konsta Lappalainen
| rowspan="4" align="center" | S
| rowspan="2" | 1, 4, 7-8, 10
|-
|  Stuart White
|-
|  Tuomas Tujula
| 1, 4, 7
|-
|  Mick Wishofer
| 8, 10
|-
| rowspan="3" align="center" | 19
|  Giacomo Altoè
| rowspan="3" align="center" | P
| rowspan="3" | 1, 4, 7-8, 10
|-
|  Arthur Rougier
|-
|  Léo Roussel
|-
| rowspan="3" align="center"| 63
|  Jack Aitken
| rowspan="3" align="center"| P
|rowspan=3| 1, 4, 7-8, 10
|-
|  Mirko Bortolotti
|-
|  Albert Costa
|-
| rowspan="4" |  EBM Grove Racing
| rowspan="9" | Porsche 911 GT3 R
| rowspan="4" align="center"| 16
|  Adrian D'Silva
| rowspan="4" align="center"| PA
|rowspan=4| 7
|-
|  Brenton Grove
|-
|  Stephen Grove
|-
|  Matthew Payne
|-
| rowspan="5" |  Singha Racing Team TP 12
| rowspan="5" align="center"| 39
|  Piti Bhirombhakdi
| rowspan="5" align="center"| G
|rowspan=2| 4, 7
|-
|  Tanart Sathienthirakul
|-
|  Matthew Payne
| 4
|-
|  Earl Bamber
| rowspan="2" | 7
|-
|  Christophe Hamon
|-
| rowspan="6" |  GSM Novamarine
| rowspan="6" | Lamborghini Huracán GT3 Evo
| rowspan="6" align="center" | 18
|  Isaac Tutumlu
| rowspan="6" align="center" | S
|rowspan=2| 2-3
|-
|  Gerhard Tweraser
|-
|  Danny Kroes
| 5-6, 9
|-
|  Lucas Mauron
| 5
|-
|  Daan Pijl
| 6
|-
| Joshua John Kreuger
| 9
|-
| rowspan="8" |  SPS Automotive Performance
| rowspan="12" | Mercedes-AMG GT3 Evo
| rowspan="8" align="center" | 20
|  Valentin Pierburg
| rowspan="4" align="center" | PA
| rowspan="2" | 1, 4, 8, 10
|-
|  Dominik Baumann
|-
|  Ian Loggie
| 1, 8, 10
|-
|  Martin Konrad
| 4
|-
| Valentin Pierburg
| rowspan="4" align="center" | Am
| rowspan="4" | 7
|-
|  Reema Juffali
|-
|  George Kurtz
|-
|  Tim Müller
|-
| rowspan="4" |  SunEnergy1 Racing
| rowspan="4" align="center"| 75
|  Dominik Baumann
| rowspan="4" align="center"| PA
|rowspan=4| 7
|-
|  Philip Ellis
|-
|  Kenny Habul
|-
|  Martin Konrad
|-
| rowspan="13" |  AF Corse
| rowspan="13" | Ferrari 488 GT3 Evo 2020
| rowspan="7" align="center"| 21
|  Alessandro Balzan
| rowspan="4" align="center"| G
|rowspan=3| 1, 4, 7-8, 10
|-
|  Hugo Delacour
|-
|  Cedric Sbirrazzuoli
|-
|  David Perel
| 7
|-
|  Cedric Sbirrazzuoli
| rowspan="3" align="center" | PA
| 2-3, 5-6, 9
|-
|  Hugo Delacour
| 2-3, 6, 9
|-
|  Stefano Costantini
| 5
|-
| rowspan="4" align="center"| 52
|  Andrea Bertolini
| rowspan="4" align="center"| PA
| rowspan="2"| All
|-
|  Louis Machiels
|-
|  Stefano Costantini
| 1, 4, 7-8, 10
|-
|  Alessio Rovera
| 7
|-
| rowspan="2" align="center" | 53
|  Pierre-Alexandre Jean
| rowspan="2" align="center" | S
| rowspan="2" | 2-3, 5-6, 9
|-
|  Ulysse de Pauw
|-
| rowspan="10" |  Allied Racing
| rowspan="10" | Porsche 911 GT3 R
| rowspan="4" align="center"| 22
|  Dominik Fischli
| rowspan="4" align="center"| S
| rowspan="3"| 1, 4, 7-8
|-
|  Patrik Matthiesen
|-
|  Joel Sturm
|-
|  Vincent Andronaco
| 7
|-
| rowspan="6" align="center"| 91
| Alex Malykhin
| rowspan="6" align="center" | G
| 4, 7-8, 10
|-
|  Ben Barker
| rowspan="2" | 4
|-
|  James Dorlin
|-
|  Ayhancan Güven
| 7-8, 10
|-
|  Julian Apothéloz
| rowspan="2" | 7
|-
|  Florian Latorre
|-
| rowspan="3" |  Heart of Racing Team
| rowspan="3" | Aston Martin Vantage AMR GT3
| rowspan="3" align="center"| 23
|  Charlie Eastwood
| rowspan="3" align="center"| P
|rowspan=3| 7
|-
|  Ross Gunn
|-
|  Alex Riberas
|-
|rowspan=8|

| rowspan="11" | Audi R8 LMS Evo II
| rowspan="4" align=center| 25
|  Patric Niederhauser
| rowspan="4" align="center"| P
| All
|-
|  Christopher Mies
|rowspan=2| 1, 4, 7-8, 10
|-
|  Lucas Légeret
|-
|  Aurélien Panis
| 2-3, 5-6, 9
|-
| rowspan="7" align="center" | 26
| Nicolas Baert
| rowspan="7" align="center" | S
| rowspan=3 | 1, 4, 7-8, 10
|-
|  César Gazeau
|-
|  Aurélien Panis
|-
|  Gilles Magnus
| 7
|-
| rowspan="3" |  Comtoyou Racing with Saintéloc
|  Nicolas Baert
| 2-3, 5-6, 9
|-
|  Gilles Magnus
| 2-3, 5, 9
|-
|  Lucas Légeret
| 6
|-
| rowspan="7" |  Leipert Motorsport
| rowspan="7" | Lamborghini Huracán GT3 Evo
| rowspan="7" align="center" | 27
|  Brendon Leitch
| rowspan="7" align="center" | S
| 1, 4, 7-8, 10
|-
|  Dennis Fetzer
|rowspan=2| 1
|-
|  Jordan Witt
|-
|  Isaac Tutumlu
| 4, 7-8, 10
|-
|  Tyler Cooke
| 4, 7, 10
|-
|  Max Weering
| 7
|-
|  Jusuf Owega
| 8
|-
| rowspan="4" |  ST Racing
| rowspan="4" | BMW M4 GT3
| rowspan="4" align="center"| 28
|  Harry Gottsacker
| rowspan="4" align="center"| S
|rowspan=4| 7
|-
|  Maxime Oosten
|-
|  Samantha Tan
|-
|  Nick Wittmer
|-
| rowspan="3"|  ROFGO Racing with Team WRT
| rowspan="19" | Audi R8 LMS Evo II
| rowspan="3" align="center"| 30
|  Benjamin Goethe
| rowspan="3" align="center"| S
| rowspan="2"| All
|-
|  Thomas Neubauer
|-
|  Jean-Baptiste Simmenauer
| 1, 4, 7-8, 10
|-
| rowspan="13" |

| rowspan="3" align="center"| 31
|  Finlay Hutchison
| rowspan="3" align="center"| S
| rowspan="3"| 1, 4, 7-8, 10
|-
|  Diego Menchaca
|-
|  Lewis Proctor
|-
| rowspan="4" align="center" | 32
|  Dries Vanthoor
| rowspan="4" align="center" | P
| rowspan="2" |All
|-
|  Charles Weerts
|-
|  Kelvin van der Linde
| 1, 4, 7-8
|-
| Ricardo Feller
| 10
|-
| rowspan="6" align="center" | 33
|  Arnold Robin
| rowspan="4" align="center" | G
| rowspan="3"| 1, 4, 7-8, 10
|-
|  Maxime Robin
|-
|  Ryuichiro Tomita
|-
|  Ulysse de Pauw
| 7
|-
|  Christopher Mies
| rowspan="2" align="center"| P
| rowspan=2| 2-3, 5-6, 9
|-
|  Jean-Baptiste Simmenauer
|-
| rowspan="3" |  Monster VR46 with Team WRT
| rowspan="3" align="center"| 46
|  Valentino Rossi
| rowspan="3" align="center"| P
|rowspan=2| All
|-
|  Frédéric Vervisch
|-
|  Nico Müller
| 1, 4, 7-8, 10
|-
| rowspan="8" |  Walkenhorst Motorsport
| rowspan="8" | BMW M4 GT3
| rowspan="4" align="center"| 34
|  Michael Dinan
| rowspan="4" align="center"| S
|rowspan=4| 7
|-
|  Robby Foley
|-
|  Richard Heistand
|-
|  Jens Klingmann
|-
| rowspan="4" align="center"| 35
|  Jörg Breuer
| rowspan="4" align="center"| Am
|rowspan=4| 7
|-
|  Theo Oeverhaus
|-
|  Henry Walkenhorst
|-
|  Don Yount
|-
| rowspan="3" |  Jota Sport
| rowspan="3" | BMW M4 GT3
| rowspan="3" align="center"| 38
|  Rob Bell
| rowspan="3" align="center"| P
|rowspan=2| 1-4, 7-8, 10
|-
|  Oliver Wilkinson
|-
|  Marvin Kirchhöfer
| 1, 4, 7-8, 10
|-
| rowspan="3" |  KCMG
| rowspan="3" | Porsche 911 GT3 R
| rowspan="3" align="center"| 47
|  Dennis Olsen
| rowspan="3" align="center"| P
|rowspan=3| 7
|-
|  Nick Tandy
|-
|  Laurens Vanthoor
|-
| rowspan="3" |  BMW Junior Team with ROWE Racing
| rowspan="7" | BMW M4 GT3
| rowspan="3" align="center"| 50
|  Daniel Harper
| rowspan="3" align="center"| P
|rowspan=3| 1, 4, 7-8, 10
|-
|  Max Hesse
|-
|  Neil Verhagen
|-
| rowspan="4" | ROWE Racing
| rowspan="4" align="center" | 98
|  Augusto Farfus
| rowspan="4" align="center" | P
| rowspan="2" | 1, 4, 7-8, 10
|-
|  Nick Yelloly
|-
|  Nicky Catsburg
| 1, 4, 7-8
|-
|  Philipp Eng
| 10
|-
| rowspan="9" | Iron Lynx
| rowspan="13" |Ferrari 488 GT3 Evo 2020
| rowspan="4" align="center" | 51
|  Miguel Molina
| rowspan="4" align="center" | P
| rowspan="2" | 1, 4, 7-8, 10
|-
|  Nicklas Nielsen
|-
|  James Calado
| 1, 4, 7-8
|-
|  Giancarlo Fisichella
| 10
|-
| rowspan="5" align="center" | 71
|  Antonio Fuoco
| rowspan="5" align="center" | P
| 1, 4, 7-8, 10
|-
|  Davide Rigon
| 1, 4, 7-8
|-
|  Daniel Serra
| 1, 4, 7
|-
|  Alessio Rovera
| 8, 10
|-
|  Alessandro Pier Guidi
| 10
|-
| rowspan="4" |  Iron Dames
| rowspan="4" align="center" | 83
|  Sarah Bovy
| rowspan="4" align="center" | G
| rowspan="3" | 1, 4, 7-8, 10
|-
|  Rahel Frey
|-
|  Michelle Gatting
|-
|  Doriane Pin
| 7
|-
| rowspan="13" |  Dinamic Motorsport
| rowspan="13" | Porsche 911 GT3 R
| rowspan="7" align="center"| 54
|  Klaus Bachler
| rowspan="7" align="center"| P
| 1, 4, 7-8, 10
|-
|  Côme Ledogar
| 1, 4, 7
|-
|  Matteo Cairoli
| 1, 4, 8, 10
|-
|  Adrien de Leener
| rowspan=2| 2-3, 5-6, 9
|-
|  Christian Engelhart
|-
|  Thomas Preining
| 7
|-
|  Alessio Picariello
| 8, 10
|-
| rowspan="6" align="center" | 56
|  Marius Nakken
| rowspan="4" align="center" |S
| rowspan="2" | 1, 4, 7-8, 10
|-
|  Giorgio Roda
|-
|  Mauro Calamia
| 1, 4, 7
|-
|  Mikkel O. Pedersen
| 7-8, 10
|-
|  Klaus Bachler
| rowspan="2" align="center"| P
| rowspan=2| 2-3, 5-6, 9
|-
|  Giorgio Roda
|-
| rowspan="8" |

| rowspan="10" | Mercedes-AMG GT3 Evo
| rowspan="3" align="center" | 55
|  Maximilian Buhk
| rowspan="3" align="center" | P
| rowspan="3" | 7
|-
|  Maro Engel
|-
|  Mikaël Grenier
|-
| rowspan="7" align="center" | 93
|  Eddie Cheever III
| rowspan="3" align="center" | G
| rowspan="3" | 1, 4
|-
|  Chris Froggatt
|-
|  Jonathan Hui
|-
|  Eddie Cheever III
| rowspan="4" align="center" | S
| rowspan="2" | 2-3, 5-6
|-
|  Chris Froggatt
|-
| rowspan="2" | Sky - Tempesta Racing by HRT
| Eddie Cheever III
| rowspan="2" | 9
|-
| Chris Froggatt
|-
| rowspan="4" |  Winward Racing
| rowspan="4" | Mercedes-AMG GT3 Evo
| rowspan="4" align="center" | 57
|  Lucas Auer
| rowspan="4" align="center" | G| rowspan="3" | 1, 4, 7-8, 10
|-
|  Lorenzo Ferrari
|-
|  Jens Liebhauser
|-
|  Russell Ward
| 7
|-
|rowspan=10|

| rowspan="10" | Audi R8 LMS Evo II
| rowspan="6" align="center" | 66
|  Dennis Marschall
| rowspan="6" align="center" | P| All
|-
|  Markus Winkelhock
| 1, 4, 7-8, 10
|-
|  Juuso Puhakka
| 1, 4
|-
|  Pieter Schothorst
| 2-3, 5-6, 9
|-
|  Ricardo Feller
| 7
|-
|  Kim-Luis Schramm
| 8, 10
|-
| rowspan="4" align="center" | 99
|  Alex Aka
| rowspan="4" align="center" | S| rowspan="2" | All
|-
|  Nicolas Schöll
|-
|  Marius Zug
| 1, 4, 7-8, 10
|-
|  Juuso Puhakka
| 7
|-
| rowspan="3" |  EMA Motorsport
| rowspan="3" | Porsche 911 GT3 R
| rowspan="3" align="center"| 74
|  Matt Campbell
| rowspan="3" align="center"| P|rowspan=3| 7
|-
|  Mathieu Jaminet
|-
|  Felipe Nasr
|-
| rowspan="13" |  Barwell Motorsport
| rowspan="13" | Lamborghini Huracán GT3 Evo
| rowspan="10" align="center" | 77
|  Alex MacDowall
| rowspan="5" align="center" | G| rowspan="2" | 1, 4, 7
|-
|  Sandy Mitchell
|-
|  Rob Collard
| 1, 4
|-
|  Sam De Haan
| rowspan="2" | 7
|-
|  Ahmad Al Harthy
|-
| Alex MacDowall
| rowspan="5" align="center" | S| 8, 10
|-
| Sam De Haan
| rowspan="2" | 8
|-
|  Patrick Kujala
|-
| Jordan Witt
| rowspan="2" | 10
|-
| James Dorlin
|-
| rowspan="3" align="center" | 78
|  Ben Barker
| rowspan="3" align="center" | G| rowspan="2" | 1-2
|-
| Alex Malykhin
|-
|  James Dorlin
| 1
|-
| rowspan="14" |

| rowspan="14" | Mercedes-AMG GT3 Evo
| rowspan="2" align="center" | 86
|  Petru Umbrarescu
| rowspan="2" align="center" | S| rowspan="2" | 2-3, 5-6, 9
|-
|  Igor Waliłko
|-
| rowspan="4" align="center"| 87
|  Casper Stevenson
| rowspan="4" align="center"| S| All
|-
|  Tommaso Mosca
| 1, 4, 7-8, 10
|-
| Konstantin Tereshchenko
| 1
|-
|  Thomas Drouet
| 2-10
|-
| rowspan="6" align="center"| 88
|  Jules Gounon
| rowspan="6" align="center"| P| 1-2, 4-8, 10
|-
|  Daniel Juncadella
| 1, 4, 7-8, 10
|-
|  Raffaele Marciello
| 1, 4, 7-8, 10
|- 
|  Jim Pla
| 2-3, 5-6, 9
|-
|  Maximilian Götz
| 3
|-
|  Tristan Vautier
| 9
|-
| rowspan="2" align="center" | 89
|  Timur Boguslavskiy
| rowspan="2" align="center" | P| rowspan="2" | 2-3, 5-6, 9
|-
|  Raffaele Marciello
|-
| rowspan="8" |  Madpanda Motorsport
| rowspan="8" | Mercedes-AMG GT3 Evo
| rowspan="8" align="center" | 90
|  Ezequiel Pérez Companc
| rowspan="8" align="center" | S| 1, 4, 7-10
|-
|  Sean Walkinshaw
| 1, 4, 7-8, 10
|-
|  Dušan Borković
| 1
|-
|  Franco Girolami
| 4
|-
|  Patrick Kujala
| rowspan="2" | 7
|-
|  Óscar Tunjo
|-
|  Patrick Assenheimer
| 8
|-
|  Fabian Schiller
| 9
|-
| rowspan="10" |  Beechdean AMR
| rowspan="10" | Aston Martin Vantage AMR GT3
|rowspan="3" align="center"| 95
|  Maxime Martin
| rowspan="3" align="center"| P|rowspan="3"| 1, 4, 7
|-
|  Marco Sørensen
|-
|  Nicki Thiim
|-
| rowspan="7" align="center" | 97
|  Valentin-Hasse Clot
| rowspan="3" align="center" | G|rowspan="3"| 1, 4
|-
|  Andrew Howard
|-
|  Théo Nouet
|-
|  Roman De Angelis
| rowspan="4" align="center" | S| rowspan="4" | 7
|-
| Charlie Fagg
|-
| Théo Nouet
|-
| David Pittard
|-
| rowspan="3" |  Toksport WRT
| rowspan="3" | Porsche 911 GT3 R
| rowspan="3" align="center"| 100
|  Julien Andlauer
| rowspan="3" align="center"| P|rowspan=3| 7
|-
|  Marvin Dienst
|-
|  Sven Müller
|-
| rowspan="7" |  CMR
| rowspan="7" | Bentley Continental GT3
| rowspan="7" align="center" | 107
|  Nigel Bailly
| rowspan="3" align="center" | PA| rowspan="3" | 1, 4
|-
|  Stéphane Lémeret
|-
|  Matthieu de Robiano
|-
| Nigel Bailly
| rowspan="4" align="center" | G| rowspan="4" | 7
|-
| Stéphane Lémeret
|-
|  Antonin Borga
|-
|  Maxime Soulet
|-
| rowspan="15" |  JP Motorsport
| rowspan="15" | McLaren 720S GT3
| rowspan="6" align="center"| 111
|  Vincent Abril
| rowspan="3" align="center"| P| rowspan="3"| 1, 4, 8, 10
|-
|  Christian Klien
|-
|  Dennis Lind
|-
|  Patryk Krupiński
| rowspan="3" align="center" | PA| 2-3, 5-6, 9
|-
|  Christian Klien
| 2-3, 5, 9
|-
|  Norbert Siedler
| 6
|-
| rowspan="9" align="center" | 112
|  Maciej Błażek
| rowspan="3" align="center" | S| rowspan="3" | 1
|-
|  Christopher Brück
|-
|  Patryk Krupiński
|-
|  Maciej Błażek
| rowspan="4" align="center" | G| rowspan="2"| 4, 8, 10
|-
|  Patryk Krupiński
|-
|  Joe Osborne
| 4
|-
| Norbert Siedler
| 8, 10
|-
|  Vincent Abril
| rowspan="2" align="center" | P| rowspan="2" | 5-6, 9
|-
|  Dennis Lind
|-
| rowspan="9" |  Garage 59
| rowspan="9" | McLaren 720S GT3
| rowspan="5" align="center" | 159
|  Manuel Maldonado
| rowspan="5" align="center" | S| All
|-
|  Ethan Simioni 
| 1-7
|-
|  Nicolai Kjærgaard
| 1, 4, 7-10
|-
|  James Baldwin
| 7
|-
| Dean MacDonald
| 8, 10
|-
| rowspan="4" align="center" | 188
|  Miguel Ramos
| rowspan="4" align="center" | PA| All
|-
|  Henrique Chaves
| rowspan="2"| 1, 4, 7-8, 10
|-
|  Alexander West
|-
|  Dean MacDonald
| 2-3, 5-7, 9
|-
| rowspan="9" | Vincenzo Sospiri Racing
| rowspan="9" |Lamborghini Huracán GT3 Evo
| rowspan="5" align="center" | 163
|  Baptiste Moulin
| rowspan="5" align="center" | S| rowspan="2" | 1, 4, 7-8, 10
|-
|  Marcus Påverud
|-
|  Luis Michael Dörrbecker
| 1, 4, 7-8
|-
|  Mattia Michelotto
| 7
|-
|  Andrea Cola
| 10
|-
| rowspan="4" align="center" | 563
|  Michele Beretta
| rowspan="4" align="center" | S| rowspan="3" | 1, 4, 7-8, 10
|-
|  Benjamin Hites
|-
|  Yuki Nemoto
|-
|  Karol Basz
| 7
|-
| rowspan="3" |  GPX Martini Racing
| rowspan="3" | Porsche 911 GT3 R
| rowspan="3" align="center"| 221
|  Michael Christensen
| rowspan="3" align="center"| P|rowspan=3| 7
|-
|  Kévin Estre
|-
|  Richard Lietz
|-
| rowspan="2" |  Imperiale Racing
| rowspan="2" | Lamborghini Huracán GT3 Evo
| rowspan="2" align="center"| 663
|  Albert Costa
| rowspan="2" align="center" | P|rowspan=2| 6
|-
|  Alberto di Folco
|-
| rowspan="2" |  LP Racing
| rowspan="2" | Lamborghini Huracán GT3 Evo
| rowspan="2" align="center"| 888
|  Jonathan Cecotto
|rowspan=2 align=center| S|rowspan=2| 6
|-
|  Mattia di Giusto
|-
|}
|valign="top"|

|}

Race results

 Championship standings 
Scoring system
Championship points are awarded for the first ten positions in each race. The pole-sitter also receives one point and entries are required to complete 75% of the winning car's race distance in order to be classified and earn points. Individual drivers are required to participate for a minimum of 25 minutes in order to earn championship points in any race.

Sprint points

Imola, Hockenheim & Barcelona points

Paul Ricard points

24 Hours of Spa points
Points are awarded after six hours, after twelve hours and at the finish.

 Drivers' Championship 

 Overall Notes:'''
  – Entry did not finish the race but was classified, as it completed more than 75% of the race distance.

See also
 2022 British GT Championship
 2022 GT World Challenge Europe Endurance Cup
 2022 GT World Challenge Europe Sprint Cup
 2022 GT World Challenge Asia
 2022 GT World Challenge America
 2022 GT World Challenge Australia
 2022 Intercontinental GT Challenge

Notes

References

External links 
 

GT World Challenge Europe
GT World Challenge Europe
2022 GT World Challenge Europe